The Caledonian MacBrayne fleet is the largest fleet of car and passenger ferries in the United Kingdom, with 34 units in operation and another 4 on order. The company provides lifeline services to 23 islands off the west coast of Scotland, as well as operating routes in the Firth of Clyde.

Caledonian MacBrayne (Calmac) vessels can be readily identified by their black hulls and white superstructures. They have red funnels with black caps that display the Lion Rampant badge with masts in buff. The fleet can be categorised into various groups. Vessels are owned by the asset holding company Caledonian Maritime Assets Limited, which is in turn wholly owned by the Scottish Government.

Groups of vessels

Major units

,
, 
, 
, 
, 
, 
,
,
, and
MV Loch Seaforth.
These vessels usually operate on the longer crossings, with high passenger numbers.

During the summer, replaced at Islay in 2011, supplements the Ardrossan - Brodick service and sails to Campbeltown. She is a spare vessel during the winter months.

Two new dual fuel ferries are being built by Ferguson Marine Engineering. The first, named  is due to enter service at Ardrossan, and is now scheduled for delivery in mid 2023. The second, Hull 802, is as yet unnamed. See also ferry fiasco for the political controversies surrounding the construction of these units.

Clyde services

There was much controversy following the decision to award the shipbuilding contracts to yards outside Scotland. The streakers' removal from Rothesay was delayed by pier work to install an end-loading linkspan, allowing full ro-ro operation.

The former Clyde ferries,  and  had provided the Dunoon and Rothesay services for the best part of 35 years. They were nicknamed the "streakers", because of their speed and ability to manoeuvre rapidly both at sea and in port. Juno and Jupiter were withdrawn from service in 2010, and by June 2011 Juno had been broken up at Rosneath, meanwhile Jupiter was sold to breakers in Denmark for recycling in that month.

From 2002, the service to Dunoon was supplemented by passenger catamaran , owned by Solent and Wightline Cruises and chartered by CalMac from Red Funnel Line.  last served Dunoon on 29 June 2011, and was then scheduled to operate the summer relief on the Arran crossing. From 30 June 2011, the Gourock - Dunoon service was awarded on a passenger-only basis to the newly formed David MacBrayne Ltd subsidiary Argyll Ferries. Argyll Ferries purchased  and a former Irish boat renamed  to serve the route. Argyll Flyer was not available for the start of the passenger-only service due to prop shaft problems. The company leased the cruise boat  from Clyde Cruises to start the service, but she was out of service with engine problems for most of the first day.

Loch class

The Loch class are a group of smaller vessels with a single car deck, running the length of the ship, with a ramp at each end. Most are symmetrical when viewed from the side, with no operational bow or stern. Passenger accommodation is down one or both sides of the ship. ,  and  also have a lounge above the car deck. They operate on shorter crossings, usually between 5 and 30 minutes, although MV Loch Portain takes 70 minutes to cross the Sound of Harris between Berneray and Leverburgh.

At  in length, they can carry 12 cars and 200 passengers. She was built for and has run on the Largs to Cumbrae route since 2007. They were made redundant by the opening of the Skye Bridge and eventually found redeployment elsewhere.

Of similar design, but larger than the Loch class,  was launched in 2012 for the Raasay service. She is powered by a hybrid combination of batteries and a small diesel engine - a world first for a sea-going RO-RO vessel. A second hybrid ferry, was launched in May 2013 for the Tarbert to Portavadie route. The third hybrid ferry, was launched on 11 December 2015 and entered service on the Claonaig to Lochranza route in September 2016.

Passenger-only vessels
MVs Argyll Flyer and Ali Cat
 (244 passengers) and the catamaran  (250 passengers) are passenger-only ferries used on the Gourock - Dunoon service. The ferries, formerly operated by Argyll Ferries, were acquired when the company was incorporated into Caledonian MacBrayne in January 2019.

MV Chieftain
 is a passenger-only vessel leased from Clyde Marine to operate the Gourock to Kilcreggan service since June 2020. She has the capacity for 100 passengers.

Other vessels
There are four vessels in the fleet which cannot be listed in the above categories.

MV Carvoria
 is a  vessel used on the Kerrera service. She was built in 2017 by Malakoff Limited in Shetland. She is a bow loading vessel of similar design to the Island Class vessels and can take twelve passengers and one car, although due to vehicle restrictions on Kerrera she rarely carries cars. She is the smallest vessel in the fleet.

MV Coruisk
 is a  "sheltered water vessel", operating on the Mallaig to Armadale route in summer, and relieving on the Clyde in winter. Her design allows her to make the crossing in reverse when sea conditions allow.

MV Lochnevis
 is a highly specialised ship serving the Small Isles of Eigg, Canna, Rùm and Muck from Mallaig. Her vehicle deck can accommodate up to 14 cars, but is empty on most sailings due to the lack of roads and vehicle restrictions on the Small Isles. She is instead used mostly for goods and vital equipment for the islands. Lochnevis has a surprisingly large vehicle ramp, which dominates her appearance. This allows her to berth a considerable distance from slipways, protecting her exposed Azipod propulsion systems in shallow waters.

MV Loch Frisa

 is a former Norled ferry bought by Caledonian MacBrayne in 2021. She was built in 2015 as Utne and operated for Norled for 6 years. She is a double-ender ferry with passenger capacity for 195, and capacity for 40 cars, or 4 HGVs. Following a naming competition, CMAL announced renaming as MV Loch Frisa.

Fleet statistics

References

External links
 Calmac.co.uk: Official Caledonian MacBrayne website
Shipsofcalmac.uk: Unofficial list of the past and current Caledonian MacBrayne fleet

.
Ferries of Scotland
Lists of ferries
Scotland transport-related lists